Pedro Antonio Troglio (born 28 July 1965) is an Argentine football manager and former player who played as a midfielder. He is the current manager of Honduran club CD Olimpia

Playing career 
During his career as a footballer, Troglio played for River Plate, as well as at the 1990 FIFA World Cup with Argentina, where he scored a goal against the USSR.

He then spent the main part of his career in Italy, playing four seasons in Serie A (for Hellas Verona, Lazio and Ascoli) and two in Serie B.

During the final years of his career, Troglio played for Gimnasia y Esgrima de La Plata and Villa Dálmine (a fourth division team where he played alongside fellow veterans José Basualdo, Roberto Monserrat, Mario Pobersnik and Raúl "Pacha" Cardozo).

Coaching career
Troglio then went on to coach Godoy Cruz de Mendoza in Primera B Nacional but he left in the middle of the tournament to take on in March 2005 a demoralized Gimnasia and helped keep the team in the Primera. The next season, he led them to 2nd place in the Apertura tournament, equalling their highest finish ever.

In June 2006 his #21 jersey was retired in Gimnasia y Esgrima de La Plata, being this the first number ever retired in an Argentine football club.

After the successful 2005 campaign, Gimnasia has performance declined markedly. Following a series of defeats in national and international competitions, including a 7:0 derby defeat to Estudiantes de La Plata, Troglio resigned in April 2007, and was temporarily replaced with former aide Ricardo Kuzemka. Nevertheless, Troglio's status with fans did not deteriorate strongly, with most press articles blaming club president Juan José Muñoz on the poor performances of the team.

In 2007, after Jorge Burruchaga's departure of Independiente, Troglio was hired to manage this institution. In March 2008, after an erratic season start, Troglio was sacked and replaced by Miguel Angel Santoro.

In 2009, he won the campeonato Apertura with Cerro Porteño. On 30 May 2010 Argentinos Juniors hired the former Cerro Porteno coach to replace Claudio Borghi.

He stepped down as manager of Argentinos on 18 September 2011 after a bad start to the 2011–12 Apertura.

In 2019 he agreed to move to Honduras to manage CD Olimpia, the club with most titles in the country. He arrived to a team experiencing a 6 tournament draught having won their last title in the 2015-16 Clausura. In 2019 Pedro and his team won the 2019-20 Clausura ending up a three and a half year without winning the cup.

On June 2, 2022, he re-signed with former club CD Olimpia after a short period with Argentine club San Lorenzo.

Career statistics

Club

International

References

External links

 

 Argentine Primera statistics at Fútbol XXI 

1965 births
Living people
Sportspeople from Buenos Aires Province
Argentine footballers
Argentine expatriate footballers
Club Atlético River Plate footballers
Hellas Verona F.C. players
S.S. Lazio players
Ascoli Calcio 1898 F.C. players
Serie A players
Serie B players
Expatriate footballers in Italy
Argentine expatriate sportspeople in Italy
J1 League players
Japan Football League (1992–1998) players
Expatriate footballers in Japan
Avispa Fukuoka players
Club de Gimnasia y Esgrima La Plata footballers
Association football midfielders
Argentina international footballers
1990 FIFA World Cup players
1989 Copa América players
Argentine football managers
Godoy Cruz Antonio Tomba managers
Club de Gimnasia y Esgrima La Plata managers
Club Atlético Independiente managers
Cerro Porteño managers
Argentinos Juniors managers
Club Atlético Tigre managers
San Lorenzo de Almagro managers
Argentine Primera División players
Expatriate football managers in Honduras
Expatriate football managers in Paraguay
Argentine expatriate sportspeople in Paraguay
Argentine expatriate sportspeople in Honduras
Argentine expatriate sportspeople in Japan